Theeyattunni (also written as Theeyatt Unni) or Theeyadi Unni is a caste of Hindu Brahmins of Kerala, India.  They are a part of the Pushpaka Brahmins and Ambalavasi community in Kerala.  Theeyattunnis are traditionally the performers of an ancient art form called Theeyatt. Theeyattunnis have the right for Tantric Poojas and other privileges enjoyed by the Nambudiri caste.

See also
Pushpakan Unni
List of Ambalavasis

References

 Tiyyatunnikal by S Damodaran Unni

Malayali Brahmins